The 2021 Genesys 300 was an IndyCar motor race held on May 1, 2021 at the Texas Motor Speedway. It was the third round of the 2021 IndyCar Series. Scott Dixon of Chip Gannasi Racing led a dominating 206 laps on route to his first victory of the season.

Entrants

Practice

Practice 1 
Tony Kanaan topped the first practice charts with a time of 00:23:55, besting Pato O'Ward in second and Takuma Sato in third.

Qualifying 
Qualifying was canceled due to rain. Consequently, qualifying results and the starting grid were set based on the entrant point standings after the Firestone Grand Prix of St. Petersburg. Championship leader Álex Palou was awarded pole.

Qualifying classification

Race

Race classification

Championship standings after the race 

Drivers' Championship standings

Engine manufacturer standings

 Note: Only the top five positions are included.

References 
Notes

Citations

External links 

Genesys 300
Genesys 300